The year 654 BC was a year of the pre-Julian Roman calendar. In the Roman Empire, it was known as year 100 Ab urbe condita . The denomination 654 BC for this year has been used since the early medieval period, when the Anno Domini calendar era became the prevalent method in Europe for naming years.

Events
 Enna is founded in Sicily.
 Traditional date of the foundation of Abdera in Thrace by colonists from Clazomenae.
 Traditional date of foundation of Akanthos by Andros.
 Traditional date of foundation of Lampsacus by Phocaea.

Births

Deaths

References